Claudio Alcívar (born 15 July 1966) is an Ecuadorian former footballer. He played in nine matches for the Ecuador national football team from 1987 to 1989. He was also part of Ecuador's squad for the 1989 Copa América tournament.

References

External links
 

1966 births
Living people
Ecuadorian footballers
Ecuador international footballers
Association football defenders
C.D. El Nacional footballers
C.D. Técnico Universitario footballers
Barcelona S.C. footballers